George Martin Merrick (February 2, 1883 - December 16, 1964) was an American writer of the Frank Buck serial Jungle Menace.

Early life
George Merrick was the son of Michael Merrick, a French-born laborer (in the 1900 US census), and Mary Merrick, a Canadian immigrant.

Career

Merrick wrote, directed and produced many movies, among them:

 The Revenge of Tarzan (1920) co-director
 Rough Riding Ranger (1935) producer, writer
 Pals of the Range (1935) producer, co-writer
 Cyclone of the Saddle (1935) producer, co-writer
 Custer's Last Stand (1936) serial; editor
 The Mysterious Pilot (1937) serial; writer
 The Secret of Treasure Island (1938) serial; producer, writer
 Secrets of a Model (1940) editor
 City of Missing Girls (1941) producer
 I'll Sell My Life (1941) producer
 Miss V from Moscow (1942) producer
 A Yank in Libya (1942) producer
 The Dawn Express (1942) producer
 Submarine Base (1943) writer
 Shake Hands with Murder (1944)
 Sweethearts of the U.S.A. (1944)
 The White Gorilla (1945) producer
 Swing, Cowboy, Swing (1946)

Work with Frank Buck
In 1937, Merrick was a writer of the Frank Buck serial Jungle Menace, and film editor of Buck's 1944 movie Tiger Fangs.

References

External links
 

1883 births
1964 deaths
American film directors
Writers from Buffalo, New York